A classified magazine is a magazine that publishes small ads and announcements, known as classifieds, for free or at relatively low cost. Typically these include items for sale and wanted, and services offered; they may also include personal ads. Some classified magazines specialise in particular areas, for example the sale of cars. Their frequency is typically monthly or weekly.

Advertisements are sometimes accompanied by small pictures of items for sale, or in the case of personal advertisements pictures of the advertisers, but mostly the content is textual. There may be a small amount of display advertising and/or journalism.

Such magazines may be national or local; distribution is via kiosks, newsstands, or dump bins, and less often via free home delivery or paid-for subscription through the mail. Many also publish their advertisements on the World Wide Web.

The business models of their publishers vary. Some issue the magazine for free, while charging advertisers; in some, advertisements are free but readers pay for their copies; in some, only advertisements offering goods under a certain value are free, and others are charged for; and some publishers charge both the advertiser and the reader. The decision as to which business model to pursue rests largely on the perceived value of the advertisements to the readers, and the perceived value to the advertisers of receiving responses to their ads.

In the case of personal advertisements, particularly, the publisher may also generate further income from the provision of a voicemail service, which allows people responding to an advertisement to call a premium rate telephone number and leave a message for the advertiser, but does not reveal the advertiser's identity.

Although termed magazines, many classified magazines are in fact printed on newsprint.

Contact magazines

A contact magazine is a type of classified magazine that is largely or wholly dedicated to personal ads. As well as publishing the personal ads, the publishers of contact magazines often run an anonymous mail forwarding service that allows advertisers to identify themselves only with box numbers.

Most contact magazines used to be swinger or sex-contact magazines aimed at a readership of people looking for or offering casual sex. With the advent of swinger social network and other adult swinger websites, these magazines are now an anachronism.  Specialized magazines also existed for those with specific sexual preferences, such as those seeking BDSM encounters, or the services of professional dominants or submissives.

References

External links
 J Ellard, J Richters and C Newman. Non-gay sexual subcultures: A content analysis of Sydney sex contact publications, National Centre in HIV Social Research, Faculty of Arts and Social Sciences, The University of New South Wales (2004) (pdf format), available via this publications list

Advertising publications by format
Advertising tools